Anton Kholyaznykov (born 10 December 1986) is a Ukrainian rower. He competed in the Men's eight event at the 2012 Summer Olympics.

References

External links
 

1986 births
Living people
Ukrainian male rowers
Olympic rowers of Ukraine
Rowers at the 2012 Summer Olympics
People from Dzhankoy